The 2013–14 Arkansas–Little Rock Trojans men's basketball team represented the University of Arkansas at Little Rock during the 2013–14 NCAA Division I men's basketball season. The Trojans, led by eleventh year head coach Steve Shields, played their home games at the Jack Stephens Center, and are members of the Sun Belt Conference. They finished the season 15–17, 9–9 in Sun Belt play to finish in a tie for fifth place. They advanced to the quarterfinals of the Sun Belt Conference tournament where they lost Arkansas State.

Roster

Schedule

 
|-
!colspan=9 style="background:#800000; color:#c4c8cb;"| Regular season

|-
!colspan=9 style="background:#800000; color:#c4c8cb;"| 2014 Sun Belt tournament

References

Arkansas-Little Rock
Little Rock Trojans men's basketball seasons
TRoj
TRoj